Sangis is a locality situated in Kalix Municipality, Norrbotten County, Sweden with 572 inhabitants in 2010.

The Sangis river runs through the village until it meets the sea a few km to the south.

References 

Populated places in Kalix Municipality
Norrbotten